Kinský Palace is a former palace, now an art museum, located on Old Town Square in the Old Town area of Prague, Czech Republic. The palace's name refers to its former ownership by the Kinský noble family.

Early history
The palace was originally built for the Golz family between 1755 and 1765. As a result, the palace is also known as Golz-Kinský Palace (Palác Golz-Kinských).

The building was designed by Kilian Ignaz Dientzenhofer and is Rococo in style. The exterior is stucco and is painted in pink and white. There are statues by Ignaz Franz Platzer on the exterior, which are of the classical elements. In 1768, the Kinský family purchased the home from the Golz family. 

Franz Kafka's father, Hermann Kafka, was a haberdasher. He had his store at the palace, which was located on the ground floor. Franz Kafka attended secondary school at the palace, from 1893 until 1901. In the interwar period, the palace housed the legation of the Republic of Poland (1922-1934).

Later history
The palace was used by Klement Gottwald in 1948 to address an audience from the palace's balcony. This took place in the final episode of the 1948 Czechoslovak coup d'état.

Since 1949, the palace has been under the administration of the National Gallery, and the building is currently used as an art museum.

See also
 List of Baroque residences

References

External links
 
 Official website (archived 22 April 2017)

Former palaces
Art museums and galleries in the Czech Republic
Kilian Ignaz Dientzenhofer buildings
Palaces in Prague
Museums in Prague
Rococo architecture in the Czech Republic
Franz Kafka
Former school buildings in the Czech Republic
1948 in Czechoslovakia
Buildings and structures completed in the 18th century
Old Town (Prague)